Folco is a surname. Notable people with the surname include:

Michel Folco (born 1943), French writer and photographer
Peter Folco (born 1953), Canadian ice hockey player 
Raymonde Folco (born 1940), Canadian politician

See also
7006 Folco, main-belt asteroid